Suleiman Tayeb Ahmed Salem is the current Sahrawi ambassador to Nicaragua, also accredited non-resident ambassador to Belize, with a base in Managua.

On August 30, 2000 he was injured in an accident, when the light aircraft he was travelling in crashed immediately after taking off from Albrook "Marcos A. Gelabert" International Airport.

Diplomatic postings
On November 20, 1997 he presented his letter of credentials to President Ernesto Pérez Balladares as the new Sahrawi ambassador to the Republic of Panama. He was later in 1998 also accredited as non-resident ambassador to Costa Rica until 2000; and on November 7, 2005 he presented his credentials to Sir Colville Young, as the first Sahrawi non-resident ambassador to Belize.

On January 30, 2010, he presented his letter of credentials to President Daniel Ortega as the Sahrawi ambassador to the Republic of Nicaragua, with another four envoyees. He had previously presented the credentials on January 8 to Nicaraguan Foreign Affairs Minister Samuel Santos López.

Honours and awards
On January 24, 2008, Suleiman Tayeb was awarded Panama's highest honour, the Order of Manuel Amador Guerrero (Grand Cross grade), given to him by vice president and Minister of Foreign Affairs Samuel Lewis Navarro, for professionalism in his decade of diplomatic service in the country.

References

Polisario Front politicians
Sahrawi Sunni Muslims
Living people
Ambassadors of the Sahrawi Arab Democratic Republic to Nicaragua
Ambassadors of the Sahrawi Arab Democratic Republic to Panama
Ambassadors of the Sahrawi Arab Democratic Republic to Belize
Ambassadors of the Sahrawi Arab Democratic Republic to Costa Rica
Year of birth missing (living people)